Survivors Guide to Prison is a 2018 documentary film directed by Matthew Cooke exploring the United States prison system, largely through the lens of two wrongly convicted men, Reggie Cole and Bruce Lisker. The film, narrated by Cooke and Susan Sarandon, focuses on problems one might face against the prison system via segments covering topics such as plea bargains, solitary confinement, and the difficulties of life after prison. The movie features interviews with former prison inmates, police officers, court officials, lawyers, and journalists, as well as many appearances by celebrities such as Danny Glover, B-Real, Macklemore, Deepak Chopra, RZA, Busta Rhymes, Q-Tip, Quincy Jones, Tom Morello, Wayne Kramer, Ice-T, and Danny Trejo. Some of the celebrities interviewed are themselves former prison inmates. The film was executive produced by Adrian Grenier and Susan Sarandon.

Production 
The film was partly crowdfunded, raising nearly $29,000 via an Indiegogo campaign. Organizations such as the ACLU and the Innocence Project also were involved with production.

Release 
Survivors Guide to Prison premiered on February 20, 2018, at The Landmark in Los Angeles. The film was subsequently released in theaters and on streaming platforms on February 23, 2018.

Reception 
Metacritic gives the film a weighted average score of 66 out of 100, based on 5 critics, indicating "generally favorable reviews".

Critics generally praised the film, especially its subject matter and statistics, with Joe Leydon at Variety calling it "surprisingly potent." For the LA Weekly, Paul Rogers spoke of the movie's "impassioned interviews" and "harrowing" score, while Simon Abrams at the Village Voice criticized its "eclectic group of celebrity experts", calling it overall "messy but compelling". The Los Angeles Times Michael Rechtshaffen also compared it to Ava DuVernay's documentary 13th.

References

External links

2018 films
American documentary films
Documentary films about crime in the United States
Documentary films about race and ethnicity in the United States
Criminal justice reform in the United States
2018 documentary films
Documentary films about law in the United States
Documentary films about human rights
Documentary films about incarceration in the United States
2010s English-language films
2010s American films